The 1988–89 NBA season was the Detroit Pistons' 41st season in the NBA and 32nd season in the Detroit metropolitan area. The Pistons moved from the Pontiac Silverdome to the brand-new Palace of Auburn Hills before the start of the season. 

The team won their first eight games of the season and held a 31–13 record at the All-Star break. However, Adrian Dantley was unhappy with his role on the team, losing playing time to Dennis Rodman at small forward. At midseason, the team traded  Dantley to the Dallas Mavericks in exchange for All-Star forward Mark Aguirre, a childhood friend of Isiah Thomas. Dantley felt that Thomas had a major role in engineering the trade, so that Aguirre could have the opportunity of winning a championship; an accusation that Thomas denied. The Pistons posted a nine-game winning streak in March, won eight consecutive games between March and April, then won their final five games, finishing with a league best record of 63–19.

Thomas led the team with 18.2 points, 8.3 assists and 1.7 steals per game, and was selected for the 1989 NBA All-Star Game, while Joe Dumars averaged 17.2 points and 5.7 assists per game, and Vinnie Johnson contributed 13.8 points per game. In addition, Bill Laimbeer provided the team with 13.7 points and 9.6 rebounds per game, while Rodman provided with 9.0 points and 9.4 rebounds per game off the bench, and Rick Mahorn averaged 7.3 points and 6.9 rebounds per game. Dumars and Rodman were both named to the NBA All-Defensive First Team, while Rodman finished in third place in Defensive Player of the Year voting, and in third place in Sixth Man of the Year voting, and head coach Chuck Daly finished in fourth place in Coach of the Year voting.

In the Eastern Conference First Round of the playoffs, the Pistons swept the Boston Celtics in three straight games, then swept the 5th-seeded Milwaukee Bucks in four straight games in the Eastern Conference Semi-finals. In the Eastern Conference Finals, they trailed 2–1 to Michael Jordan and the Chicago Bulls, but managed to win the series in six games to advance to the NBA Finals, where the Pistons would win their first ever NBA championship, sweeping the Los Angeles Lakers in four straight games, as Dumars was named Finals MVP. This series was a rematch from last year's NBA Finals, with the Pistons avenging their NBA Finals loss. 

Following the season, Mahorn was selected by the expansion Minnesota Timberwolves in the 1989 NBA Expansion Draft, but never played for them, as he was then traded to the Philadelphia 76ers soon after. The Pistons and Lakers would face each other again 15 years later in the NBA Finals in 2004, where the Pistons won in five games en route to their third NBA championship, despite being underdogs to the heavily-favored Lakers.

Draft picks

Roster

Regular season
On February 15, 1989, the Pistons traded Adrian Dantley to the Dallas Mavericks for Mark Aguirre. Dantley was unhappy relegating the leadership role on the Pistons to Isiah Thomas, while Aguirre had clashed with his coaches and teammates in Dallas. Aguirre was more amenable to deferring to Thomas, and accepted his role in Chuck Daly's system.  His ability to shoot the three, post up, run the floor, and pass was instrumental in the growth of the team.

Season standings

Record vs. opponents

Game log

Regular season

|- align="center" bgcolor="#ccffcc"
| 1
| November 4, 1988
| @ Chicago
| W 107–94
|
|
|
| Chicago Stadium
| 1–0
|- align="center" bgcolor="#ccffcc"
| 8
| November 18, 1988
| @ Phoenix
| W 121–105
|
|
|
| Arizona Veterans Memorial Coliseum
| 8–0
|- align="center" bgcolor="#ffcccc"
| 11
| November 23, 1988
| New York
| L 111–133
|
|
|
| The Palace of Auburn Hills
| 9–2
|- align="center" bgcolor="#ccffcc"
| 12
| November 26, 1988
| L.A. Lakers
| W 102–99
|
|
|
| The Palace of Auburn Hills
| 10–2

|- align="center" bgcolor="#ffcccc"
| 17
| December 6, 1988
| @ Milwaukee
| L 84–109
|
|
|
| Bradley Center
| 13–4
|- align="center" bgcolor="#ccffcc"
| 18
| December 7, 1988
| Chicago
| W 102–89
|
|
|
| The Palace of Auburn Hills
| 14–4
|- align="center" bgcolor="#ffcccc"
| 21
| December 14, 1988
| Milwaukee
| L 110–119
|
|
|
| The Palace of Auburn Hills
| 16–5
|- align="center" bgcolor="#ffcccc"
| 25
| December 22, 1988
| @ New York
| L 85–88
|
|
|
| Madison Square Garden
| 18–7
|- align="center" bgcolor="#ccffcc"
| 26
| December 28, 1988
| Phoenix
| W 106–100
|
|
|
| The Palace of Auburn Hills
| 19–7

|- align="center" bgcolor="#ffcccc"
| 31
| January 11, 1989
| New York
| L 93–100
|
|
|
| The Palace of Auburn Hills
| 21–10
|- align="center" bgcolor="#ffcccc"
| 33
| January 15, 1989
| @ Milwaukee
| L 112–120
|
|
|
| Bradley Center
| 22–11
|- align="center" bgcolor="#ccffcc"
| 38
| January 25, 1989
| Golden State
| W 105–104
|
|
|
| The Palace of Auburn Hills
| 26–12
|- align="center" bgcolor="#ccffcc"
| 41
| January 31, 1989
| @ Chicago
| W 104–98 (OT)
|
|
|
| Chicago Stadium
| 28–13

|- align="center" bgcolor="#ccffcc"
| 43
| February 5, 1989
| Chicago
| W 113–102
|
|
|
| The Palace of Auburn Hills
| 30–13
|- align="center" bgcolor="#ccffcc"
| 44
| February 8, 1989
| Milwaukee
| W 107–96
|
|
|
| The Palace of Auburn Hills
| 31–13
|- align="center" bgcolor="#ccffcc"
| 45
| February 14, 1989
| @ L.A. Lakers
| W 111–103
|
|
|
| Great Western Forum
| 32–13
|- align="center" bgcolor="#ffcccc"
| 47
| February 18, 1989
| @ Golden State
| L 119–121 (OT)
|
|
|
| Oakland-Alameda County Coliseum Arena
| 33–14

|- align="center" bgcolor="#ccffcc"
| 57
| March 8, 1989
| Seattle
| W 112–96
|
|
|
| The Palace of Auburn Hills
| 41–16
|- align="center" bgcolor="#ffcccc"
| 62
| March 18, 1989
| @ Milwaukee
| L 100–117
|
|
|
| Bradley Center
| 45–17
|- align="center" bgcolor="#ccffcc"
| 69
| March 31, 1989
| @ Seattle
| W 111–108
|
|
|
| Seattle Center Coliseum
| 52–17

|- align="center" bgcolor="#ccffcc"
| 72
| April 6, 1989
| Chicago
| W 115–108
|
|
|
| The Palace of Auburn Hills
| 54–18
|- align="center" bgcolor="#ccffcc"
| 73
| April 7, 1989
| @ Chicago
| W 114–112 (OT)
|
|
|
| Chicago Stadium
| 55–18
|- align="center" bgcolor="#ccffcc"
| 74
| April 9, 1989
| Milwaukee
| W 100–91
|
|
|
| The Palace of Auburn Hills
| 56–18
|- align="center" bgcolor="#ffcccc"
| 77
| April 14, 1989
| @ New York
| L 100–104
|
|
|
| Madison Square Garden
| 58–19

Playoffs

|- align="center" bgcolor="#ccffcc"
| 1
| April 28, 1989
| Boston
| W 101–91
| Joe Dumars (25)
| Bill Laimbeer (12)
| Isiah Thomas (10)
| The Palace of Auburn Hills21,454
| 1–0
|- align="center" bgcolor="#ccffcc"
| 2
| April 30, 1989
| Boston
| W 102–95
| Isiah Thomas (26)
| Bill Laimbeer (15)
| Isiah Thomas (8)
| The Palace of Auburn Hills21,454
| 2–0
|- align="center" bgcolor="#ccffcc"
| 3
| May 2, 1989
| @ Boston
| W 100–85
| Vinnie Johnson (25)
| Dennis Rodman (9)
| Isiah Thomas (10)
| Boston Garden14,890
| 3–0
|-

|- align="center" bgcolor="#ccffcc"
| 1
| May 10, 1989
| Milwaukee
| W 85–80
| Bill Laimbeer (19)
| Bill Laimbeer (17)
| Joe Dumars (6)
| The Palace of Auburn Hills21,454
| 1–0
|- align="center" bgcolor="#ccffcc"
| 2
| May 12, 1989
| Milwaukee
| W 112–92
| John Salley (23)
| Dennis Rodman (13)
| Isiah Thomas (10)
| The Palace of Auburn Hills21,454
| 2–0
|- align="center" bgcolor="#ccffcc"
| 3
| May 14, 1989
| @ Milwaukee
| W 110–90
| Isiah Thomas (26)
| Bill Laimbeer (11)
| Joe Dumars (10)
| Bradley Center18,633
| 3–0
|- align="center" bgcolor="#ccffcc"
| 4
| May 15, 1989
| @ Milwaukee
| W 96–94
| Joe Dumars (22)
| Isiah Thomas (10)
| Isiah Thomas (13)
| Bradley Center18,633
| 4–0
|-

|- align="center" bgcolor="#ffcccc"
| 1
| May 21, 1989
| Chicago
| L 88–94
| Rick Mahorn (17)
| Bill Laimbeer (15)
| Isiah Thomas (10)
| The Palace of Auburn Hills21,454
| 0–1
|- align="center" bgcolor="#ccffcc"
| 2
| May 23, 1989
| Chicago
| W 100–91
| Isiah Thomas (33)
| Dennis Rodman (12)
| Isiah Thomas (4)
| The Palace of Auburn Hills21,454
| 1–1
|- align="center" bgcolor="#ffcccc"
| 3
| May 27, 1989
| @ Chicago
| L 97–99
| Mark Aguirre (25)
| Dennis Rodman (13)
| Isiah Thomas (11)
| Chicago Stadium18,676
| 1–2
|- align="center" bgcolor="#ccffcc"
| 4
| May 29, 1989
| @ Chicago
| W 86–80
| Isiah Thomas (27)
| Dennis Rodman (18)
| Isiah Thomas (6)
| Chicago Stadium18,676
| 2–2
|- align="center" bgcolor="#ccffcc"
| 5
| May 31, 1989
| Chicago
| W 94–85
| Vinnie Johnson (22)
| Dennis Rodman (14)
| Isiah Thomas (12)
| The Palace of Auburn Hills21,454
| 3–2
|- align="center" bgcolor="#ccffcc"
| 6
| June 2, 1989
| @ Chicago
| W 103–94
| Isiah Thomas (33)
| Dennis Rodman (15)
| Joe Dumars (9)
| Chicago Stadium18,676
| 4–2
|-

|-
|- align="center" bgcolor="#ccffcc"
| 1
| June 6, 1989
| L.A. Lakers
| W 109–97
| Isiah Thomas (24)
| Aguirre, Rodman (10)
| Isiah Thomas (9)
| The Palace of Auburn Hills21,454
| 1–0
|- align="center" bgcolor="#ccffcc"
| 2
| June 8, 1989
| L.A. Lakers
| W 108–105
| Joe Dumars (33)
| Mark Aguirre (6)
| Isiah Thomas (7)
| The Palace of Auburn Hills21,454
| 2–0
|- align="center" bgcolor="#ccffcc"
| 3
| June 11, 1989
| @ L.A. Lakers
| W 114–110
| Joe Dumars (31)
| Dennis Rodman (19)
| Isiah Thomas (8)
| Great Western Forum17,505
| 3–0
|- align="center" bgcolor="#ccffcc"
| 4
| June 13, 1989
| @ L.A. Lakers
| W 105–97
| Joe Dumars (23)
| Johnson, Laimbeer (6)
| three players tied (5)
| Great Western Forum17,505
| 4–0
|-

Playoffs
After finishing with the best record in the NBA, the Pistons swept through the first two rounds of the playoffs. In the Eastern Conference finals, they faced the Chicago Bulls, whom they had defeated in the conference semifinals a year earlier. Although the Bulls were able to win two of the first three games, the Pistons' use of their "Jordan Rules" defense wore out Michael Jordan, setting up Detroit's second consecutive NBA Finals appearance against the Los Angeles Lakers.

Player stats

Regular season

Playoffs

NBA Finals

The Pistons' overpowering play allowed them to sweep the Lakers, who struggled to fill the defensive void left by Byron Scott's injury prior to the start of the Finals. Joe Dumars was named Finals MVP. In addition, Magic Johnson pulled a hamstring early in the second game, and unable to play the rest of the series. The Lakers' depleted backcourt allowed the Pistons to easily win the 1988–89 NBA Championship.

Pistons win series 4–0

Award winners
Joe Dumars, NBA Finals Most Valuable Player Award
Joe Dumars, NBA All-Defensive First Team
Dennis Rodman, NBA All-Defensive First Team

External links
 Detroit Pistons on Database Basketball
 Detroit Pistons on Basketball Reference

References

Det
Detroit Pistons seasons
Eastern Conference (NBA) championship seasons
NBA championship seasons
Detroit Pistons
Detroit Pistons